Seve de Campo (born 15 July 1998) is an Australian cross-country skier who competes internationally.
 
He represented his country at the 2022 Winter Olympics.

References

Living people
1998 births
Australian male cross-country skiers
Sportspeople from Melbourne
Cross-country skiers at the 2022 Winter Olympics
Olympic cross-country skiers of Australia
Competitors at the 2023 Winter World University Games
21st-century Australian people